The Pointe d'Orny (3,271 m) is a mountain of the Mont Blanc massif, located west of Orsières in the canton of Valais. It lies north-east of the Plateau du Trient.

Below the summit lies the Cabane du Trient, a mountain hut operated by the Swiss Alpine Club.

References

External links
Pointe d'Orny on Hikr

Mountains of the Alps
Alpine three-thousanders
Mountains of Valais
Mountains of Switzerland
Mont Blanc massif